Arun Gulab Gawli (born 17 July 1955) also known as Arun Gulab Ahir, is an Indian politician, underworld don and retired gangster. Gawli and his brother Kishor (Pappa) entered the Mumbai underworld in the 1970s, when they joined the "Byculla Company", a criminal gang led by Rama Naik and Babu Reshim, operating in the central Mumbai areas of Byculla, Parel and Saat Rasta. In 1988, after Rama Naik was killed in a police encounter, Gawli took over the gang and began operating it from his residence, Dagdi Chawl. Under his control, the gang controlled most criminal activities in the central Mumbai areas. Throughout the late eighties and nineties, Gawli's gang was involved in a power struggle with Dawood Ibrahim's D-Company gang. Gawli is also the founder of the Akhil Bharatiya Sena political party based in Maharashtra.

Early and personal life
Arun Gawli was born in Pohegaon, Ahmednagar district, Maharashtra, India. He married Zubeida Mujawar, who later became Asha Gawli after marriage and converted to Hinduism. She was a Member of the Legislative Assembly (MLA) for Maharashtra and they both have five children, two sons and three daughters including Mahesh and Geeta, Yogita,Yatika Geeta is a first term ABS corporator from the Chinchpokli assembly constituency. Gawli's nephew Sachin Ahir is an MLA and is the former Maharashtra Minister of State for Housing. Gawli's uncle Hukumchand Yadav was a legislator from Khandwa in Madhya Pradesh.

Criminal activities
Gawli worked in textile mills, located in the central areas of Parel, Chinchpokli, Byculla and Cotton Green. From the 1970s to the late 1980s, Mumbai's textile mill industry witnessed mass strikes and eventual lock-outs. As a result, many young adults (including Gawli)  had no employment and eventually found a short-cut to quick money through matka gambling and hafta-vasuli. Gawli then joined the "Byculla Company" gang led by gangsters Rama Naik and Babu Reshim and supervised their illegal liquor dens. Arun Gawali got his underworld name as DADDY. This "Byculla Company" became popular in Mumbai Underworld and it was well known as BRA Gang as the first initials of three gang leaders Rama Naik, Babu Reshim and Arun Gawali.

After the death of gang leader Rama Naik by his bodyguard Buwa and Babu Reshim, Gawali took the whole responsibility of BRA Gang and lead the gang in Central Bombay. Arun Gawali became the first Marathi Gang Leader of Mumbai Underworld. Famous Gangster of Pune Ajit Bhai Lawand joined Gawali gang in the late 80's and started operations in Pune as well. Ajit Lawand was the right hand of Arun Gawli and had ruled Pune,Satara and Mumbai during 1990's.
Gawli gang came to fame in Pune because of Lawand. In the year 1993, Lawand was shot dead by rivals in Nigadi, Pune. Lawand is still remembered as one of the top gangsters of Pune. He is remembered for his social work done in Mumbai, Pune and Satara district.

Mumbai police raided the premises of Dagdi Chawl several times and finally broke Gawli's underworld operations. Gawli was arrested several times for criminal activities and was detained for long periods during the trial. However, he could not be convicted in most of the cases as witnesses would not depose against him for fear of retaliation. He was finally convicted of the murder of Shiv Sena leader Kamlakar Jamsandekar by a court in August 2012. Gawli and eleven others were found guilty of Jamsandekar's murder and Gawali was sentenced to life imprisonment.

Politics
Gawli got political patronage in the 1980s, when the then Shiv Sena chief, Bal Thackeray, criticised the Mumbai police for taking stringent action against Hindu gangsters like Arun Gawli and Sai Bansod, referring to them as amchi mulgey (our boys). Thackeray was challenged by a rival gangster in an open letter carried on the front page of a city tabloid. However, Gawli fell out with Shiv Sena in the mid 1990s, murdered Shiv Sena men and formed his own political party, the Akhil Bharatiya Sena.

In 2004, Gawli was elected as a Member of the Legislative Assembly (MLA) from the Mumbai Chinchpokli constituency as an Akhil Bharatiya Sena candidate. Gawli's rise in prominence is believed to be due to his "native roots" as a local lad, which makes him distinct from most other non-Marathi-speaking politicians.

Gawli's political designs suffered a major blow when his nephew and party legislator, Sachin Ahir, came out openly against him and joined Sharad Pawar's Nationalist Congress Party. Ahir even contested against Gawli in the subsequent Lok Sabha elections on a Nationalist Congress Party ticket, resulting in defeat for them both, but a victory for the Shiv Sena's sitting MP Mohan Rawale. Gawli's daughter Geeta was a ex a corporator to the Brihanmumbai Municipal Corporation.

In popular culture
In the 2015 Marathi movie Dagadi Chawl, Makarand Deshpande's character called Daddy is mainly based on Arun Gawli's life. Ankush Choudhary played the lead and as Arun Gawli's lieutenant.
The Hindi film Daddy was released on 8 September 2017 and is based on Gawli's life, starring Arjun Rampal in and as Daddy.
 In the Netflix series Sacred Games, based on the best-selling novel by Vikram Chandra, the lead character and anti-hero Ganesh Gaitonde is loosely based on Arun Gawli. The part of Isa is loosely based on Dawood Ibrahim.

References

Living people
Maharashtra MLAs 2004–2009
Akhil Bharatiya Sena politicians
Criminals from Mumbai
Marathi politicians
1955 births
Indian Hindus
Prisoners sentenced to life imprisonment by India
Indian prisoners sentenced to life imprisonment
Indian people convicted of murder
People convicted of murder by India
Prisoners and detainees of Maharashtra